Arthur Richard Dede (July 12, 1895 – September 6, 1971) was a professional baseball player who played catcher in one game for the 1916 Brooklyn Robins. After his playing career ended, he was a scout for the Brooklyn Dodgers from 1947 to 1957 and the New York Yankees from 1958 to 1971.

External links

1895 births
1971 deaths
Major League Baseball catchers
Brooklyn Robins players
Brooklyn Dodgers scouts
New York Yankees scouts
Baseball players from New York (state)
Burials at the Cemetery of the Evergreens